The Land Walker is the first  bipedal robot. It was invented by Masaaki Nagumo and created by researchers who hope to someday create similar robots to be used in the military and law enforcement.

Design 
It has a cockpit, similar to a small airplane, big enough to seat one human. Two cannons are mounted on the arms of the robot, which fire rubber or plastic balls.

Enryu 
The Land Walker is very similar to the biped robot Enryu, which was also created by the Sakakibara Kikai Co. in Tmsuk, Japan. It shuffles faster than the Land Walker because it uses caterpillar-like tracks instead of legs. It was built to help in emergency situations, like rushing into a burning building, lifting heavy objects, and rescuing people. Its arms act like human arms, which is different from the Land Walker's arms.

See also
Mecha
Remote weapon system

References

External links
 Archived product page at sakakibara-kikai.co.jp
 Land Walker produced by Sakakibara-Kikai at TheOldRobots.com

Rolling robots
Robots of Japan
Individual mecha